The German Wildlife Route runs through the Eifel mountains.

It was opened on 26 July 1970. Following a 180-kilometre-long circular route from the red deer park in the town of Daun, it runs past various other wildlife conservation parks. It continues via Gerolstein, Birresborn, Neustraßburg, Gondorf, Manderscheid and Gillenfeld before returning to Daun.

The route also goes past the volcanic maars of the Eifel mountains.

External links 

 Wildpark Daun
 Adler- und Wolfspark Kasselburg 
 Eifelzoo

German tourist routes
Eifel